Shchetinovka is a rural locality (a selo) and the administrative center of Shchetinovskoye Rural Settlement, Belgorodsky District, Belgorod Oblast, Russia. The population was 906 as of 2010. There are 13 streets.

Geography 
Shchetinovka is located 29 km southwest of Maysky (the district's administrative centre) by road. Valkovsky is the nearest rural locality.

References 

Rural localities in Belgorodsky District
Belgorodsky Uyezd